Tell Me Everything is a solo album by cellist Ernst Reijseger released in 2008 on Winter & Winter Records.

Reception
James Manheim of Allmusic stated in his review that "there are passages involving hand percussion on the body of the cello, for example, and modern jazz drumming and the freer varieties of jazz in general seem to be important components of the music. ...The jazz influence is by no means thoroughgoing; there are echoes Bach's music for unaccomapanied cello, of Romantic virtuoso music, and of minimalism. Reijseger never does the same thing twice, and in fact the pieces resemble each other very little, which is quite an accomplishment for a disc of solo cello music. The sound, recorded in a medieval Tuscan commenda, or commandry house, is magical".

The song "Tell Me Everything" has been performed by Peter Hudler as a part of his concert Cello on Fire.

Track listing

Personnel
Ernst Reijseger – cello

References

Winter & Winter Records albums
Ernst Reijseger albums
2008 albums